The Annales Sangallenses maiores (Latin for Greater Annals of St Gall) are annals compiled in St Gallen, covering the years 927 through to 1059. They continue the Annales Alamannici, the St Gallen version of which reaches up to 926.

Editions and facsimiles
 Roland Zingg, Die St. Galler Annalistik (Ostfildern, 2019)
 'XVI Annales Sangallenses Maiores', ed. by Ildefonsus ab Arx, in Annales et chronica aevi Carolini, ed. by Georgius Heinricus Pertz, Monumenta Germaniae Historica, 1 (Hannover: Tomusus, 1826), pp. 72-85 
 Cod. Sang. 915 in E-codices; the annals begin on page 196. The autograph manuscript of the annals.
 Cod. Sang. 453 in E-codices; the annals begin on page 211. A twelfth-century copy.

Further reading 
 Ernst Tremp and Pascal Ladner, 'Aus der Welt der St. Galler Annalen. Zur Edition der Annales Sangallenses', in Deutsches Archiv für Erforschung des Mittelalters, 77 (2021), vol. 1, pp. 1–22.
 Entry in Geschichtsquellen

References

Carolingian Latin historical texts